HIF Akademi was a Swedish football club located in Helsingborg. The club was a feeder team to Helsingborgs IF.

Background
HIF Akademi was created on 2 March 2013 after Helsingborgs IF took over the club Ramlösa Södra FF and renamed it Helsingborgs IF Akademi. They played their home matches at the Olympia in Helsingborg. The club was dissolved in 2016 as a result of the relegation of Helsingborgs IF to Superettan.

The club was affiliated to Skånes Fotbollförbund.

References

External links
 Helsingborgs IF Akademi – Official Facebook Page

Football clubs in Skåne County
Defunct football clubs in Sweden
Association football clubs disestablished in 2016